In algebra, a perfect complex of modules over a commutative ring A is an object in the derived category of A-modules that is quasi-isomorphic to a bounded complex of finite projective A-modules. A perfect module is a module that is perfect when it is viewed as a complex concentrated at degree zero. For example, if A is Noetherian, a module over A is perfect if and only if it is finitely generated and of finite projective dimension.

Other characterizations 
Perfect complexes are precisely the compact objects in the unbounded derived category  of A-modules. They are also precisely the dualizable objects in this category.

A compact object in the ∞-category of (say right) module spectra over a ring spectrum is often called perfect; see also module spectrum.

Pseudo-coherent sheaf 
When the structure sheaf  is not coherent, working with coherent sheaves has awkwardness (namely the kernel of a finite presentation can fail to be coherent). Because of this, SGA 6 Expo I introduces the notion of a pseudo-coherent sheaf.

By definition, given a ringed space , an -module is called pseudo-coherent if for every integer , locally, there is a free presentation of finite type of length n; i.e., 
.

A complex F of -modules is called pseudo-coherent if, for every integer n, there is locally a quasi-isomorphism  where L has degree bounded above and consists of finite free modules in degree . If the complex consists only of the zero-th degree term, then it is pseudo-coherent if and only if it is so as a module.

Roughly speaking, a pseudo-coherent complex may be thought of as a limit of perfect complexes.

See also 
Hilbert–Burch theorem
elliptic complex (related notion; discussed at SGA 6 Exposé II, Appendix II.)

References

Further reading 
 https://mathoverflow.net/questions/354214/determinantal-identities-for-perfect-complexes
An alternative definition of pseudo-coherent complex

External links 
http://stacks.math.columbia.edu/tag/0656
http://ncatlab.org/nlab/show/perfect+module

Abstract algebra